The Rhineland Girl is a 1930 German musical romance film directed by Johannes Meyer and starring Gretel Berndt, Lucie Englisch and Werner Fuetterer.

Cast 
 Gretel Berndt as Lore
 Lucie Englisch as Mizzi
 Werner Fuetterer as Hans Waldorf
 Trude Berliner as Grete
 Ilse Nast as Ilse
 Ernst Dernburg
 Harry Frank
 George Pleß
 Ernst Behmer
 Max Wilmsen

References

Bibliography

External links 
 

1930 films
1930s romantic musical films
Films of the Weimar Republic
German romantic musical films
1930s German-language films
Films directed by Johannes Meyer
German black-and-white films
1930s German films